The Arvia'juaq and Qikiqtaarjuk National Historic Site contains two areas:  Arvia'Juaq and Qikiqtaaruk. Arvia'juaq (Sentry Island ), an island in Hudson Bay, is located close to Arviat, Nunavut. It is a National Historic Site of Canada and a Paallirmiut Inuit summer camp site. The site is co-managed between the community of Arviat and Parks Canada.

Arvia'Juaq is a traditional summer camp of the Paallirmiut Inuit, and a virtual tour of the National Historic Site was made in 2017: https://www.aina.ucalgary.ca//arviajuaq/Tour.html

Qikiqtaarjuk, (Inuktitut syllabics: ᕿᑭᖅᑖᕐᔪᒃ, Inuktitut for little island) is a small peninsula, just north of Arviat, that faces Arvia'juaq. Like Arvia'juaq, Qikiqtaarjuk contains many Paallirmiut artifacts and both are considered ritual, spiritual, and sacred sites. In particular Qikiqtaarjuk is associated with the Inuit hero figure Kiviuq.

See also
 Qikiqtaarjuk
 Igloolik Island#Qikiqtaarjuk, a former island, featured in the film Atanarjuat: The Fast Runner, that is now a peninsula

References

External links
 Photo
 Explore Arvia'juaq by virtual tour: https://www.aina.ucalgary.ca//arviajuaq/index_en.html

National Historic Sites in Nunavut
Parks in Qikiqtaaluk Region